Łukasz or Lukasz is a Polish masculine given name, derived from Greek Λουκᾶς, Lukas. 

Derived family names are Łukaszewski, Łukaszewicz/Łukasiewicz/Lukashevich, Lukash (as transliterated from Ukrainian and Belarusian), Lukashenko (Ukrainian)/Lukashenka (Belarusian).

The name may refer to:

Łukasz Abgarowicz (born 1949), Polish politician
Łukasz Broź (born 1985), Polish footballer (defender) who plays for Widzew Łódź
Łukasz Burliga (born 1988), Polish footballer who plays for Wisła Kraków
Łukasz Chyła (born 1981), Polish track and field sprint athlete
Łukasz Cieślewicz (born 1987), Polish professional football (soccer) player
Łukasz Ciepliński (1913–1951), Polish soldier who fought in the Polish anti-Nazi and anti-communist resistance movements
Łukasz Czapla (born 1982), Polish sport shooter, a four-time World champion
Łukasz Derbich (born 1983), Polish footballer
Lukasz Dumanski (born 1983), Ivory Coast-born Polish-Canadian professional poker player who now resides in Canada
Łukasz Fabiański (born 1985), Polish footballer who currently plays as a world class goalkeeper for English Premier League club West Ham United
Łukasz Foltyn (born 1974), Polish programmer, the creator of Gadu-Gadu instant messenger and Foltyn Commander program
Łukasz Górnicki (1527–1603), Polish humanist, writer, secretary and chancellor of Sigismund August of Poland
Łukasz Garguła (born 1981), Polish footballer who currently plays for Wisła Kraków
Lukasz "Dr. Luke" Gottwald (born 1973), American songwriter and record producer
Łukasz Grzeszczyk (born 1987), Polish footballer who plays as a midfielder for Widzew Lodz
Łukasz Jóźwiak, Polish ice dancer, former partner of Paulina Urban
Łukasz Jankowski (born 1982), Polish motorcycle speedway rider riding with the Poole Pirates in the British Elite League
Łukasz Janoszka (born 1987), Polish footballer who plays as a forward for Ruch Chorzów
Łukasz Jarosz (born 1979), professional Polish Heavyweight kickboxer and martial artist
Łukasz Juszkiewicz (born 1983), Polish footballer (midfielder) playing currently for Widzew Łódź
Łukasz Kadziewicz (born 1980), Polish volleyball player
Łukasz Kalinowski (born 1983), Polish footballer (midfielder) playing currently for Unia Janikowo
Łukasz Kamiński (born 1973), Polish historian, specializing in history of Poland after 1945
Łukasz Karwowski (born 1965), Polish film director, screenwriter and producer
Łukasz Kolenda (born 1999), Polish professional basketball player
Łukasz Koszarek (born 1984), Polish professional basketball player
Łukasz Kruczek (born 1975), Polish ski jumper who competed from 1996 to 2003
Łukasz Krzycki (born 1984), footballer who plays in Ekstraklasa for Piast Gliwice
Łukasz Kubik (born 1978), Polish footballer who currently plays for Odra Opole
Łukasz Kubot (born 1982), professional male tennis player from Poland
Łukasz Kuropaczewski (born 1981), Polish classical guitarist
Łukasz Kuryłowicz (born 1981), Polish economist, academic and author
Łukasz Madej (born 1982), Polish professional football midfielder who plays for Slask Wroclaw
Łukasz Maszczyk (born 1984), Polish amateur boxer who qualified for the 2008 Olympics at Light-Flyweight
Łukasz Mierzejewski (born 1982), Polish footballer who plays as a forward for Cracovia Kraków
Łukasz Nawotczyński (born 1982), Polish footballer playing as defender for Korona Kielce
Łukasz Opaliński (1581–1654) (1581–1654), Polish–Lithuanian nobleman
Łukasz Opaliński (1612–1666) (1612–1666), Polish nobleman
Łukasz Pawłowski (born 1983), Polish rower
Łukasz Piątek (born 1985), Polish footballer, who plays as a midfielder
Łukasz Piszczek (born 1985), Polish footballer who plays as a midfielder or right-back for Borussia Dortmund
Łukasz Różycki, Polish pair skater who skated with Aneta Kowalska
Łukasz Romanek (1983–2006), Polish speedway rider, won Under-19 European Champion title
Łukasz Rutkowski (born 1988), Polish ski jumper
Łukasz Sapela (born 1982), Polish goalkeeper who plays for GKS Bełchatów
Łukasz Siemion (born 1985), Polish Olympic rower
Łukasz Skrzyński (born 1978), Polish defender who plays for Polonia Warsaw
Łukasz Sosin (born 1977), Polish footballer striker playing currently for Kavala
Łukasz Surma (born 1977), Polish footballer (defensive midfielder) playing for Lechia Gdańsk
Łukasz Szczoczarz (born 1984), Polish footballer who plays as a forward for Cracovia Kraków
Łukasz Szukała (born 1984), Polish football player
Łukasz Trałka (born 1984), Polish football player who currently plays for Polonia Warszawa
Łukasz Tumicz (born 1985), Polish football forward, who plays for Jagiellonia Białystok
Łukasz Tupalski (born 1980), Polish footballer
Łukasz Urban (1979–2016), Polish lorry driver, kidnapped and killed by terrorist Anis Amri in the 2016 Berlin truck attack
Łukasz Uszalewski (born 1988), Polish defender who has been playing for Cracovia Kraków since 2005
Łukasz Woszczyński (born 1983), Polish sprint canoeist who competed in the mid-2000s
Łukasz Załuska (born 1982), Polish footballer who used to play for Scottish club Celtic
Łukasz Zakrzewski (born 1984), Polish sailor, ice sailor
Łukasz Zbonikowski (born 1978), Polish politician
Łukasz Żygadło (born 1979), Polish professional volleyball player

See also
Tournament in Łukasz Romanek Memory, annual motorcycle speedway event held each year organized by the RKM Rybnik

Polish masculine given names